Boris Nikolayevich Spirin (born 3 December 1970 in Moscow) is a former Russian football player.

References

1970 births
Footballers from Moscow
Living people
Soviet footballers
FC Dynamo Moscow reserves players
FC Kolkheti Khobi players
Russian footballers
FC Tyumen players
Russian Premier League players
Russian expatriate footballers
FC Asmaral Moscow players
FC Volgar Astrakhan players
Association football midfielders
Association football forwards